The Player Project (formerly Player/Stage Project) creates free and open-source software for research into robotics and sensor systems. Its components include the Player network server and the Stage platform robotics simulators. Although accurate statistics are hard to obtain, Player is one of the most popular open-source robot interfaces in research and post-secondary education. Most of the major intelligent robotics journals and conferences regularly publish papers featuring real and simulated robot experiments using Player and Stage.

Overview
The Player Project is an umbrella under which two robotics-related software projects are currently developed. These include the Player networked robotics server, and the Stage 2D robot simulation environment. The project was founded in 2000 by Brian Gerkey, Richard Vaughan and Andrew Howard at the University of Southern California at Los Angeles, and is widely used in robotics research and education. It releases its software under the GNU General Public License with documentation under the GNU Free Documentation License.

The Player is set of application programming interfaces (APIs, e.g., position2d, bumper, ir, speech, power) that can be implemented by a robot chassis (Roomba, Khephera etc.), possibly over serial line or network, or by Stage (2D simulator) or Gazebo (3D simulator).

Player 
The Player software runs on Microsoft Windows, and Portable Operating System Interface (POSIX) compatible operating systems, including Linux, macOS, Solaris, and Berkeley Software Distribution (BSD) variants. Player can be described as a 'robot abstraction layer,' in that all devices are abstracted into a set of pre-defined interfaces.

Player supports a wide variety of hardware (sensor devices and robot platforms alike). It also contains client library support for several programming languages including C, C++, Python and Ruby. Third-party client libraries are available in other languages including Java and Tcl. Added features include a minimal and flexible design, support for interfacing with multiple devices concurrently, and on-the-fly server configuration.

Stage 
The Stage simulator is a 2D multiple-robot simulation environment built on Fast Light Toolkit (FLTK). Stage provides a basic simulation environment that can be scaled to model one to hundreds of robots at a time. Stage can be used alone to simulate robot behaviors via user-defined control programs. Stage can also interface with Player, allowing users of Player to access simulated sensors and devices through the Player interfaces.

Gazebo 

The Gazebo 3D robot simulator was a component in the Player Project from 2004 through 2011. Gazebo integrated the Open Dynamics Engine (ODE) physics engine, OpenGL rendering, and support code for sensor simulation and actuator control. In 2011, Gazebo became an independent project support by Willow Garage.

Supported robots 
 Acroname's Garcia
 Botrics's Obot d100
 CoroWare Inc. Corobot and Explorer
 Evolution Robotics' ER1 and ERSDK robots
 iRobot's Roomba vacuuming robot
 K-Team's Robotics Extension Board (REB) attached to Kameleon 376BC
 K-Team's Khephera
 MobileRobots' (formerly ActivMedia) PSOS/P2OS/AROS-based robots
 Nomadics' NOMAD200 (and possibly related) mobile robots
 RWI/iRobot's RFLEX-based robots (e.g., B21r, ATRV Jr)
 Segway's Robotic Mobility Platform (RMP)
 UPenn GRASP's Clodbuster
 Videre Design's ERRATIC mobile robot platform
 White Box Robotics' 914 PC-BOT

See also 

 Simbad robot simulator
 Microsoft Robotics Studio
 Webots
 URBI
 Turtle (robot)
 Mobile Robot Programming Toolkit
 Robot Operating System (ROS)

References

External links
 
 Player Project wiki
 Gazebo Simulator

Free software projects
Robotics simulation software
2000 software
2000 in robotics